This is an incomplete list of Acts of the Parliament of Great Britain for the years 1720–1739.  For Acts passed up until 1707 see List of Acts of the Parliament of England and List of Acts of the Parliament of Scotland.  See also the List of Acts of the Parliament of Ireland to 1700 and the List of Acts of the Parliament of Ireland, 1701–1800.

For Acts passed from 1801 onwards see List of Acts of the Parliament of the United Kingdom.  For Acts of the devolved parliaments and assemblies in the United Kingdom, see the List of Acts of the Scottish Parliament, the List of Acts of the Northern Ireland Assembly, and the List of Acts and Measures of the National Assembly for Wales; see also the List of Acts of the Parliament of Northern Ireland.

The number shown after each Act's title is its chapter number. Acts are cited using this number, preceded by the year(s) of the reign during which the relevant parliamentary session was held; thus the Union with Ireland Act 1800 is cited as "39 & 40 Geo. 3 c. 67", meaning the 67th Act passed during the session that started in the 39th year of the reign of George III and which finished in the 40th year of that reign.  Note that the modern convention is to use Arabic numerals in citations (thus "41 Geo. 3" rather than "41 Geo. III"). Acts of the last session of the Parliament of Great Britain and the first session of the Parliament of the United Kingdom are both cited as "41 Geo. 3".

Acts passed by the Parliament of Great Britain did not have a short title; however, some of these Acts have subsequently been given a short title by Acts of the Parliament of the United Kingdom (such as the Short Titles Act 1896).

Before the Acts of Parliament (Commencement) Act 1793 came into force on 8 April 1793, Acts passed by the Parliament of Great Britain were deemed to have come into effect on the first day of the session in which they were passed.  Because of this, the years given in the list below may in fact be the year before a particular Act was passed.

1720-1729

1720 (7 Geo. 1 St. 1)

| {{|Bath Highways, Streets, etc. Act 1720|public|19|08-12-1720|note3=|repealed=y|archived=n|An Act for continuing an act made in the sixth year of the reign of her late Majesty Queen Anne, intituled, An act for repairing and enlarging the highways between the top of Kingsdown Hill and the city of Bath; and also several highways leading to and through the said city; and for cleaning, paving, and lighting the streets, and regulating the chairman there; and for explaining and making the said act more effectual.}}
| {{|Bridlington Piers Act 1720|public|16|08-12-1720|note3=|repealed=y|archived=n|An Act for the better preserving and keeping in repair the piers of the town an dport of Whitby in the county of York; and for explaining and making more effectual the several acts passed for lengthening and repairing the piers of Bridlington in the said county.}}
| {{|Buckinghamshire Roads Act 1720|public|24|08-12-1720|note3=|repealed=y|archived=n|An Act for repairing  the road from Wendover to the town of Buckingham in the county of Bucks.}}
| {{|Crown Lands – Forfeited Estates Act 1720|public|22|08-12-1720|note3=|repealed=y|archived=n|An Act for enabling Charles Earl of Arran to purchase the forfeited estates of James Butler, late Duke of Ormonde; and for granting relief to William late Lord Widdrington, and for enlarging the time for determining claims upon the forfeited estates and for enabling the commissioners for the said forfeited estates to certify into the exchequer all such estates as they have found to be given to popish or superstitious usage.}}
| {{|Debts Due to the Army Act 1720|public|30|08-12-1720|note3=|repealed=y|archived=n|An Act for appointing  commissioners to examine, state and determine the debts due to the army.}}
| {{|General Pardon Act 1720|public|29|08-12-1720|note3=|repealed=y|archived=n|An Act for the King's most gracious, general and free pardon.}}
| {{|Highgate and Chipping Barnet Road Act 1720|public|18|08-12-1720|note3=|repealed=y|archived=n|An Act for enlarging the term granted by an act passed in the tenth year of the reign of her late Majesty Queen Anne, intituled, An act for repairing the road from Highgate Gatehouse in the county of Middlesex, to Barnet Blockhouse in the county of Hertford; and for repairing the road leading from the Bear-Inn in Hadley, to the sign of the Angel in Enfield Chase in the said county of Middlesex.}}
| {{|Jedburgh Beer Duties Act 1720|public|25|08-12-1720|note3=|repealed=y|archived=n|An Act for laying a duty of two pennies Scots, or one sixth part of a penny sterling, upon every Scots pint of ale or beer that shall be brewed for sale, vended or tapped within the town of Jedburgh and privileges thereof, for paying publick debts of the said town,  and for supplying the same with fresh water, and for other purposes therein mentioned.}}
| {{|Journeymen Tailors, London Act 1720|public|13|08-12-1720|note3=|repealed=y|archived=n|An Act for regulating the journeymen taylors within the weekly bills of mortality.}}
| {{|Land Tax Act 1720|public|4|08-12-1720|note3=|repealed=y|archived=n|An act for granting an aid to his Majesty by a land-tax to be raised in Great Britain, for the service of the year on thousand seven hundred twenty one.}}
| {{|Ledbury Highways Act 1720|public|23|08-12-1720|note3=|repealed=y|archived=n|An Act for repairing the several roads leading from the town of Ledbury in the county of Hereford, to the several places therein mentioned.}}
| {{|Marylebone Road Act 1720|public|26|08-12-1720|note3=|repealed=y|archived=n|An Act for repairing the road from St. Giles's pound to Kilbourne-Bridge in the county of Middlesex.}}
| {{|Mutiny Act 1720|public|6|23-03-1721|repealed=y|archived=n|An Act for punishing mutiny and desertion, and for the better payment of the army and their quarters.}}
| {{|National Debt Act 1720|public|5|23-03-1721|repealed=y|archived=n|An Act to enable the South-Sea company to ingraft part of their capital stock and fund into the stock and fund of the Bank of England, and another part thereof into the stock and fund of the East-India company; and for giving further time for payments to be made by the said South-Sea company to the use of the publick.}}
| {{|Pension Duties Act 1720|note1=|public|27|08-12-1720|note3=|repealed=y|archived=n|An Act for raising a sum not exceeding five hundred thousand pounds, by charging annuities at the rate of five pounds per centum per annum upon the civil list revenues till redeemed by the crown; and for enabling his Majesty, his heirs or successors (by causing such a deduction to be made as therein is mentioned) to make good to the civil list the payments which shall have been made upon the said annuities; and for borrowing money upon certain lottery-tickets; and for discharging the corporations for assurances of part of the money which they were obliged to pay to his Majesty; and for making good a deficiency to the East-India company.}}
| {{|Quarantine Act 1720|public|3|08-12-1720|note3=|repealed=y|archived=n|An Act for repealing an act made in the ninth year of the reign of her late majesty Queen Anne, intituled, An act to oblige ships coming from places infected more effectually to perform their quarantine;}and for the better preventing the plaque being brought from foreign parts into Great Britain or Ireland, or the isles of Guernsey, Jersey, Alderney, Sark or Man; and to hinder the spreading of infection.}}
| {{|River Dane: Navigation Act 1720|public|17|08-12-1720|note3=|repealed=y|archived=n|An Act for making navigable the river Dane from Northwich, where it joins to the river Weaver, to the falling in of Wheelock-Brook, and Wheelock Brook up to Wheelock-Bridge in the county of Chester.}}
| {{|River Kennet, Berkshire: Navigation Act 1720|public|8|23-03-1721|repealed=y|archived=n|An act for englarging the time for making the river Kennet navigable from Reading to Newbury in the county of Berks.}}
| {{|River Weaver: Navigation Act 1720|public|10|23-03-1721|repealed=y|archived=n|An Act for making the river Weaver navigable from Frodham-Bridge to Winsford-Bridge in the county of Chester.}}
| {{|Rivers Mercy and Irwell: Navigation Act 1720|public|15|08-12-1720|note3=|repealed=y|archived=n|An act for making the rivers Mercy and Irwell navigable from Liverpoole to Manchester, in the county palatine of Lancaster.}}
| {{|Rye Harbour Act 1720|public|9|23-03-1721|repealed=y|archived=n|An Act for the better preservation of the harbour of Rye in the county of Sussex.}}
| {{|Saint George's Chapel and Street Lighting, Yarmouth Act 1720|public|11|23-03-1721|repealed=y|archived=n|An Act for finishing and adorning the new chapel, called Saint George's chapel, in Great Yarmouth in the county of Norfolk, an for enlightening the streets of the said town, by a duty or imposition on coals, culm and cinders to be landed and consumed there.}}
| {{|Shoreditch Highways Act 1720|public|32|08-12-1720|note3=|repealed=y|archived=n|An Act to explain and amend the act of the twelfth year of her late Majesty's reign, intituled, An act for repairing the highway or road from Stones End in the parish of St. Leonard Shoreditch in the county of Middlesex, to the furthermost part of the northern road in the parish of Enfield in the same county, next to the parish of Cheshunt in the County of Hertford.}}
| {{|Silk Manufacturers Act 1720|public|12|08-12-1720|note3=|repealed=y|archived=n|An Act for imploying the manufacturers and encouraging the consumption of raw silk and mohair yarn, by prohibiting the wearing of buttons and button-holes made of cloth, serge or other stuffs.}}
| {{|South Sea Company Act 1720|public|1|08-12-1720|note3=|repealed=y|archived=n|An Act for granting to his Majesty an aid by a land tax to be raised in Great Britain, for the service of the year one thousand seven hundred and nineteen.}}
| {{|South Sea Company Act 1720|public|2|08-12-1720|note3=|repealed=y|archived=n|An Act to disable the present sub-governor, deputy-governor and directors of the South-Sea company, at from and after the respective times for electing a sub-governor, deputy-governor and new directors of the said company, to take hold or enjoy any office, place or employment in the said company, or in the East-India company, or bank of England, and from voting upon elections in the said company.}}
| {{|South Sea Company Act 1720|public|28|08-12-1720|note3=|repealed=y|archived=n|An Act for raising money upon the estates of the late sub-governor, deputy-governor, directors, cashier, deputy-cashier, and accountant of the South-Sea company, and of John Aislabie, esquire, and likewise of James Craggs, senior, esquire, deceased, towards making good the great loss and damage sustained by the said company, and for disabling such of the said persons as are living, to hold any office or place of trust under the crown, or to sit or vote in parliament for the future, and for other purposes in the said act expressed.}}
| {{|Taxation, etc. Act 1720|public|20|08-12-1720|note3=|repealed=y|archived=n|An Act for continuing the duties on malt, mum, cyder and perry, to raise money by way of a lottery, for the service of the year one thousand seven hundred twenty one; and for transferring the deficiency of a late malt-act to the land-tax for the said year; and for disposing certain overplus money to proper objects of charity; and for giving further time to clerks and apprentices to pay duties omitted to be paid for their indentures and contracts; and touching small quantities of cyber exported; and for relief of captain John Perry concerning Daggenham Breach; and touching lost bills, tickets or orders; and concerning the duty of small pieces of plate; and to enable the undertakers for raising Thames Water in York-Buildings to sell annuities by way of a lottery; and for satisfying a debt, which was charged on the late duty on hops; and for appropriating the monies granted in the session of parliament.}}
| {{|Trade to East Indies, etc. Act 1720|public|21|08-12-1720|note3=|repealed=y|archived=n|An act for the further preventing his Majesty's subjects from trading to the East-Indies under foreign commissions; and for encouraging and further securing the lawful trade thereto; and for further regulating the pilots of Dover, Deal, and the Isle of Thanet.}}
| {{|Watchett (Somerset) Harbour Act 1720|public|14|08-12-1720|note3=|repealed=y|archived=n|An act for continuing the duties granted by several acts made in the sixth and tenth years of her late Majesty's reign, for repairing the harbour and key of Watchett in the county of Somerset.}}
| {{|Woollen, etc., Manufactures Act 1720|public|7|23-03-1721|repealed=y|archived=n|An Act to preserve and encourage the woollen and silk manufacturers of this kingdom, and for more effectual employing the poor, by prohibiting the use and wear of all printed, painted, stained or dyed callicoes in apparel, household stuff, furniture, or otherwise, after the twenty fifth day of December one thousand seven hundred and twenty two (except as therein is excepted).}}
}}

1721

7 Geo. 1 St. 2

Public acts

}}

Private acts

}}

8 Geo. 1

| {{|Bridport, Dorset, Harbour Act 1721|public|11|19-10-1721|note3=|repealed=y|archived=n|}}
| {{|Charterhouse Governors (Quorum) Act 1721|public|29|19-10-1721|note3=|repealed=y|archived=n|}}
| {{|Commerce with Certain Countries Act 1721|public|8|19-10-1721|note3=|repealed=y|archived=n|}}
| {{|Customs, etc. Act 1721|public|18|19-10-1721|note3=|repealed=y|archived=n|}}
| {{|Eden River, Cumberland (Temporary Tolls for Improvement) Act 1721|public|14|19-10-1721|note3=|repealed=y|archived=n|}}
| {{|Elgin Beer Duties Act 1721|public|7|19-10-1721|note3=|repealed=y|archived=n|}}
| {{|Game Act 1721|public|19|19-10-1721|note3=|repealed=y|archived=n|}}
| {{|Hertford Highways Act 1721|public|9|19-10-1721|note3=|repealed=y|archived=n|}}
| {{|Highgate and Hampstead Highways Act 1721|public|5|19-10-1721|note3=|repealed=y|archived=n|}}
| {{|Importation Act 1721|public|12|19-10-1721|note3=|repealed=y|archived=n|}}
| {{|Judgments, Wales and Counties Palatine Act 1721|public|25|19-10-1721|note3=|repealed=y|archived=n|}}
| {{|Land Tax Act 1721|public|1|19-10-1721|note3=|repealed=y|archived=n|}}
| {{|Lotteries Act 1721|note1=|public|2|19-10-1721|note3=|repealed=y|archived=n|}}
| {{|Mutiny Act 1721|public|3|19-10-1721|note3=|repealed=y|archived=n|}}
| {{|National Debt Act 1721|public|20|19-10-1721|note3=|repealed=y|archived=n|}}
| {{|National Debt Act 1721|public|22|19-10-1721|note3=|repealed=y|archived=n|}}
| {{|Nottingham and Leicester Highways Act 1721|public|13|19-10-1721|note3=|repealed=y|archived=n|}}
| {{|Piracy Act 1721|public|24|19-10-1721|note3=|repealed=y|archived=n|An Act for the more effectual suppressing of Piracy.}}
| {{|Quakers Act 1721|public|6|19-10-1721|note3=|repealed=y|archived=n|}}
| {{|Quarantine Act 1721|public|10|19-10-1721|note3=|repealed=y|archived=n|An Act for repealing such Clauses in the Act passed in the seventh Year of His Majesty's Reign (relating to Quarantine and the Plague) as give Power to remove Persons from their Habitations, or to make Lines about Places infected.}}
| {{|Salt Duties, etc. Act 1721|public|4|19-10-1721|note3=|repealed=y|archived=n|}}
| {{|Salt Duties, etc. Act 1721|public|16|19-10-1721|note3=|repealed=y|archived=n|}}
| {{|Sevenoaks Grammar School and Charity Act 1721|public|31|19-10-1721|note3=|repealed=y|archived=n|}}
| {{|Shipwrecked Mariners Act 1721|public|17|19-10-1721|note3=|repealed=y|archived=n|}}
| {{|Silk Subsidies, Various Duties, Import of Furs, etc. Act 1721|public|15|19-10-1721|note3=|repealed=y|archived=n|}}
| {{|South Sea Company Act 1721|public|21|19-10-1721|note3=|repealed=y|archived=n|}}
| {{|South Sea Company Act 1721|public|23|19-10-1721|note3=|repealed=y|archived=n|}}
| {{|Westminster (Water Supply) Act 1721|public|26|19-10-1721|note3=|repealed=y|archived=n|}}
| {{|Whitechapel Highways Act 1721|public|30|19-10-1721|note3=|repealed=y|archived=n|}}
| {{|York Butter Trade Supervision Act 1721|public|27|19-10-1721|note3=|repealed=y|archived=n|}}
}}

1722 (9 Geo. 1)

| {{|Attainder of Bishop of Rochester Act 1722|public|17|09-10-1722|note3=|repealed=y|archived=n|An Act to inflict Pains and Penalties on Francis, Lord Bishop of Rochester.}}
| {{|Attainder of George Kelley Act 1722|public|16|09-10-1722|note3=|repealed=y|archived=n|An Act to inflict Pains and Penalties on George Kelley, alias Johnson.}}
| {{|Attainder of John Plunket Act 1722|public|15|09-10-1722|note3=|repealed=y|archived=n|An Act to inflict Pains and Penalties on John Plunket.}}
| {{|Buckinghamshire Highways Act 1722|public|13|09-10-1722|note3=|repealed=y|archived=n|}}
| {{|Continuance of Acts, 1722|public|8|09-10-1722|note3=|repealed=y|archived=n|}}
| {{|Copyholds Act 1722|public|29|09-10-1722|note3=|repealed=y|archived=n|}}
| {{|Criminal Law Act 1722|note1= (the so-called "Black Act")|public|22|09-10-1722|note3=|repealed=y|archived=n|An Act for the more effectual punishing wicked and evil disposed Persons going armed in Disguise and doing Injuries and Violence to the Persons and Properties of His Majesty's Subjects, and for the more speedy bringing the Offenders to Justice.}}
| {{|Customs Act 1722|public|21|09-10-1722|note3=|repealed=y|archived=n|}}
| {{|Dover Harbour Act 1722|public|30|09-10-1722|note3=|repealed=y|archived=n|}}
| {{|Dunstable Roads Act 1722|public|11|09-10-1722|note3=|repealed=y|archived=n|}}
| {{|Fortifications—Portsmouth Act 1722|note1=|public|32|09-10-1722|note3=|repealed=y|archived=n|}}
| {{|Frauds by Journeymen Shoemakers Act 1722|public|27|09-10-1722|note3=|repealed=y|archived=n|}}
| {{|Gloucestershire Highways Act 1722|public|31|09-10-1722|note3=|repealed=y|archived=n|}}
| {{|Great Yarmouth Pier Act 1722|public|10|09-10-1722|note3=|repealed=y|archived=n|}}
| {{|Habeas Corpus Suspension Act 1722|public|1|09-10-1722|note3=|repealed=y|archived=n|}}
| {{|Linlithgow Beer Duties Act 1722|public|20|09-10-1722|note3=|repealed=y|archived=n|}}
| {{|Lotteries Act 1722|note1=|public|19|09-10-1722|note3=|repealed=y|archived=n|}}
| {{|Mutiny Act 1722|public|4|09-10-1722|note3=|repealed=y|archived=n|}}
| {{|National Debt Act 1722|public|5|09-10-1722|note3=|repealed=y|archived=n|}}
| {{|National Debt Act 1722|public|6|09-10-1722|note3=|repealed=y|archived=n|}}
| {{|National Debt Act 1722|public|12|09-10-1722|note3=|repealed=y|archived=n|}}
| {{|Norwich, Mayors, Sheriffs, etc. Act 1722|public|9|09-10-1722|note3=|repealed=y|archived=n|}}
| {{|Papists Act 1722|public|24|09-10-1722|note3=|repealed=y|archived=n|}}
| {{|Poor Relief Act 1722|note1= (also known as the Workhouse Test Act or Knatchbull's Act)|public|7|09-10-1722|note3=|repealed=y|archived=n|An Act for Amending the Laws relating to the Settlement, Employment, and Relief of the Poor.}}
| {{|South Sea Company Act 1722|public|23|09-10-1722|note3=|repealed=y|archived=n|}}
| {{|Taxation Act 1722 c2|public|2|09-10-1722|note3=|repealed=y|archived=n|}}
| {{|Taxation Act 1722 c3|public|3|09-10-1722|note3=|repealed=y|archived=n|}}
| {{|Taxation Act 1722 c18|public|18|09-10-1722|note3=|repealed=y|archived=n|}}
| {{|The Mint in Southwark Act 1722|public|28|09-10-1722|note3=|repealed=y|archived=n|An act for more effectual execution of justice in a pretended privileged place in the parish of Saint George in the county of Surrey, commonly called the Mint; and for bringing to speedy and exemplary justice such offenders as are therein mentioned; and for giving relief to such persons as are proper objects of charity and compassion there.}}
| {{|Trade to the East Indies Act 1722|public|26|09-10-1722|note3=|repealed=y|archived=n|}}
}}

1723 (10 Geo. 1)

| {{|Causey, Yarmouth to Caistor Act 1723|note1=|public|8|09-01-1724|note3=|repealed=y|archived=n|}}
| {{|Continuance of Acts, etc., 1723|public|17|09-01-1724|note3=|repealed=y|archived=n|}}
| {{|Court of Session Act 1723|note1=|public|19|09-01-1724|note3=|repealed=y|archived=n|}}
| {{|Encouragement of Manufacturers Act 1723|public|11|09-01-1724|note3=|repealed=y|archived=n|}}
| {{|Essex Roads Act 1723|public|9|09-01-1724|note3=|repealed=y|archived=n|}}
| {{|Examination of Drugs Act 1723|public|20|09-01-1724|note3=|repealed=y|archived=n|}}
| {{|Excise Act 1723|public|10|09-01-1724|note3=|repealed=y|archived=n|}}
| {{|Greenland Fishery Act 1723|public|16|09-01-1724|note3=|repealed=y|archived=n|}}
| {{|Land Tax Act 1723|public|1|09-01-1724|note3=|repealed=y|archived=n|}}
| {{|Manufacture of Serges, etc. Act 1723|public|18|09-01-1724|note3=|repealed=y|archived=n|}}
| {{|Middlesex Highways Act 1723|public|6|09-01-1724|note3=|repealed=y|archived=n|}}
| {{|Mutiny Act 1723|public|3|09-01-1724|note3=|repealed=y|archived=n|}}
| {{|National Debt Act 1723|public|5|09-01-1724|note3=|repealed=y|archived=n|}}
| {{|Papists Act 1723|public|4|09-01-1724|note3=|repealed=y|archived=n|An Act for explaining and amending an act of the last session of parliament, intituled, an act to oblige all persons, being papists, in that part of Great Britain called Scotland, and all persons in Great Britain, refusing or neglecting to take the oaths appointed for the security of His Majesty's person and government, by several acts herein mentioned, to register their names and real estates, and for enlarging the time for taking the said oaths, and making such registers, and for allowing farther time for the enrolment of deeds or wills made by papists, which have been omitted to be enrolled, pursuant to an act of the third year of his Majesty's reign; and also for giving relief to protestant lessees.}}
| {{|Rye Harbour Act 1723|public|7|09-01-1724|note3=|repealed=y|archived=n|}}
| {{|South Sea Company Act 1723|public|14|09-01-1724|note3=|repealed=y|archived=n|}}
| {{|Surrey and Sussex Roads Act 1723|public|13|09-01-1724|note3=|repealed=y|archived=n|}}
| {{|Taxation, etc. Act 1723|public|2|09-01-1724|note3=|repealed=y|archived=n|}}
| {{|Warwick Roads Act 1723|public|15|09-01-1724|note3=|repealed=y|archived=n|}}
}}

1724 (11 Geo. 1)

| {{|Bail in Criminal Cases (Scotland) Act 1724|public|26|12-11-1724|note3=|repealed=y|archived=n|}}
| {{|Bedfordshire Roads Act 1724|public|20|12-11-1724|note3=|repealed=y|archived=n|}}
| {{|Cambridge Roads Act 1724|public|14|12-11-1724|note3=|repealed=y|archived=n|}}
| {{|Charities of Thomas Guy Act 1724|public|12|12-11-1724|note3=|repealed=y|archived=n|}}
| {{|City of London Elections Act 1724|public|18|12-11-1724|note3=|repealed=y|archived=n|}}
| {{|Cloth Manufacturer Act 1724|public|24|12-11-1724|note3=|repealed=y|archived=n|}}
| {{|Continuance of Acts, etc., 1724|public|29|12-11-1724|note3=|repealed=y|archived=n|}}
| {{|Customs Act 1724|public|7|12-11-1724|note3=|repealed=y|archived=n|}}
| {{|Derbyshire Roads Act 1724|public|13|12-11-1724|note3=|repealed=y|archived=n|}}
| {{|Hertfordshire Roads Act 1724|public|11|12-11-1724|note3=|repealed=y|archived=n|}}
| {{|Indemnity, Masters in Chancery Act 1724|public|2|12-11-1724|note3=|repealed=y|archived=n|}}
| {{|Insolvent Debtors Relief Act 1724|public|21|12-11-1724|note3=|repealed=y|archived=n|}}
| {{|Keeping of Gunpowder Act 1724|public|23|12-11-1724|note3=|repealed=y|archived=n|}}
| {{|Kent Roads Act 1724|public|5|12-11-1724|note3=|repealed=y|archived=n|}}
| {{|Kent Roads Act 1724|public|15|12-11-1724|note3=|repealed=y|archived=n|}}
| {{|Land Tax Act 1724|public|1|12-11-1724|note3=|repealed=y|archived=n|}}
| {{|Margate Pier Act 1724|public|3|12-11-1724|note3=|repealed=y|archived=n|}}
| {{|Mischief by Fire Act 1724|public|28|12-11-1724|note3=|repealed=y|archived=n|}}
| {{|Municipal Elections Act 1724|public|4|12-11-1724|note3=|repealed=y|archived=n|}}
| {{|Mutiny Act 1724|public|6|12-11-1724|note3=|repealed=y|archived=n|}}
| {{|National Debt Act 1724|public|17|12-11-1724|note3=|repealed=y|archived=n|}}
| {{|National Debt Reduction Act 1724|note1=|public|9|12-11-1724|note3=|repealed=y|archived=n|}}
| {{|Northampton and Warwick Roads Act 1724|public|25|12-11-1724|note3=|repealed=y|archived=n|}}
| {{|Parton, Cumberland, Harbour Act 1724|public|16|12-11-1724|note3=|repealed=y|archived=n|}}
| {{|River Nene, Norfolk: Navigation Act 1724|public|19|12-11-1724|note3=|repealed=y|archived=n|}}
| {{|Shelterers in Wapping, Stepney, etc. Act 1724|public|22|12-11-1724|note3=|repealed=y|archived=n|}}
| {{|Stamford Bridge, Yorkshire (Replacement and Tolls) Act 1724|public|10|12-11-1724|note3=|repealed=y|archived=n|}}
| {{|Taxation Act 1724|public|8|12-11-1724|note3=|repealed=y|archived=n|}}
| {{|Wiltshire Roads Act 1724|public|27|12-11-1724|note3=|repealed=y|archived=n|}}
}}

1725 (12 Geo. 1)

| {{|Brick Making Act 1725|public|35|20-01-1726|note3=|repealed=y|archived=n|}}
| {{|Continuance of 9 G 1 c 22 Act 1725|public|30|20-01-1726|note3=|repealed=y|archived=n|}}
| {{|Customs, etc., Revenues Act 1725|public|28|20-01-1726|note3=|repealed=y|archived=n|}}
| {{|Essex Roads Act 1725|public|23|20-01-1726|note3=|repealed=y|archived=n|}}
| {{|Foston Bridge and Witham Common Road Act 1725|public|16|20-01-1726|note3=|repealed=y|archived=n|}}
| {{|Frivolous Arrests Act 1725|note1=|public|29|20-01-1726|note3=|repealed=y|archived=n|}}
| {{|Fulham and Putney Bridge Act 1725|public|36|20-01-1726|note3=|repealed=y|archived=n|}}
| {{|Glasgow Beer Duties Act 1725|public|27|20-01-1726|note3=|repealed=y|archived=n|}}
| {{|Gloucestershire Roads Act 1725|public|24|20-01-1726|note3=|repealed=y|archived=n|}}
| {{|Hertfordshire Roads Act 1725|public|10|20-01-1726|note3=|repealed=y|archived=n|}}
| {{|Kensington, Chelsea and Fulham Roads (Tolls) Act 1725|public|37|20-01-1726|note3=|repealed=y|archived=n|}}
| {{|Land Tax Act 1725|public|1|20-01-1726|note3=|repealed=y|archived=n|}}
| {{|Leicestershire Road Act 1725|public|5|20-01-1726|note3=|repealed=y|archived=n|}}
| {{|Liverpool to Prescot Road Act 1725|public|21|20-01-1726|note3=|repealed=y|archived=n|}}
| {{|Malt Duties, etc. Act 1725|public|4|20-01-1726|note3=|repealed=y|archived=n|}}
| {{|Mutiny Act 1725|public|3|20-01-1726|note3=|repealed=y|archived=n|}}
| {{|Newbury to Marlborough Road Act 1725|public|8|20-01-1726|note3=|repealed=y|archived=n|}}
| {{|Nisi Prius, Middlesex Act 1725|public|31|20-01-1726|note3=|repealed=y|archived=n|}}
| {{|Norfolk: Improvement Act 1725|public|15|20-01-1726|note3=|repealed=y|archived=n|}}
| {{|Norwich and Thetford Road Act 1725|public|22|20-01-1726|note3=|repealed=y|archived=n|}}
| {{|Pension Duties Act 1725|note1=|public|2|20-01-1726|note3=|repealed=y|archived=n|}}
| {{|Petersfield to Portsmouth Road Act 1725|public|19|20-01-1726|note3=|repealed=y|archived=n|}}
| {{|River Dun, York: Navigation Act 1725|public|38|20-01-1726|note3=|repealed=y|archived=n|}}
| {{|Roads, Gloucester to Hereford Act 1725|public|13|20-01-1726|note3=|repealed=y|archived=n|}}
| {{|Saint James' Square: Rates Act 1725|public|25|20-01-1726|note3=|repealed=y|archived=n|}}
| {{|Saint Mary-le-Strand Rectory Act 1725|public|39|20-01-1726|note3=|repealed=y|archived=n|}}
| {{|Shropshire Roads Act 1725|public|9|20-01-1726|note3=|repealed=y|archived=n|}}
| {{|Suitors of Court of Chancery Act 1725|public|32|20-01-1726|note3=|repealed=y|archived=n|}}
| {{|Suitors of Court of Chancery Act 1725|public|33|20-01-1726|note3=|repealed=y|archived=n|}}
| {{|Taxation, etc. Act 1725|public|12|20-01-1726|note3=|repealed=y|archived=n|}}
| {{|Taxation, etc. Act 1725|public|26|20-01-1726|note3=|repealed=y|archived=n|}}
| {{|Tewkesbury Roads Act 1725|public|18|20-01-1726|note3=|repealed=y|archived=n|}}
| {{|Tyburn and Uxbridge Road Act 1725|public|17|20-01-1726|note3=|repealed=y|archived=n|}}
| {{|Wiltshire Roads Act 1725|public|7|20-01-1726|note3=|repealed=y|archived=n|}}
| {{|Wiltshire Roads Act 1725|public|11|20-01-1726|note3=|repealed=y|archived=n|}}
| {{|Woollen Manufactures Act 1725|public|34|20-01-1726|note3=|repealed=y|archived=n|}}
| {{|Worcester Roads Act 1725|public|14|20-01-1726|note3=|repealed=y|archived=n|}}
| {{|Worcester to Droitwich Road Act 1725|public|20|20-01-1726|note3=|repealed=y|archived=n|}}
}}

1726 (13 Geo. 1)

Public Acts

| {{|Birmingham and Wednesbury Roads Act 1726|public|14|17-01-1727|note3=|repealed=y|archived=n|}}
| {{|Bristol Roads Act 1726|public|12|17-01-1727|note3=|repealed=y|archived=n|}}
| {{|Bromsgrove and Birmingham Roads Act 1726|public|15|17-01-1727|note3=|repealed=y|archived=n|}}
| {{|Chippenham Roads Act 1726|public|13|17-01-1727|note3=|repealed=y|archived=n|}}
| {{|Cirencester Roads Act 1726|public|11|17-01-1727|note3=|repealed=y|archived=n|}}
| {{|Continuance of Acts, 1726|public|27|17-01-1727|note3=|repealed=y|archived=n|}}
| {{|Cranford to Maidenhead Road Act 1726|public|31|17-01-1727|note3=|repealed=y|archived=n|}}
| {{|Crown Lands – Forfeited Estates Act 1726|public|28|17-01-1727|note3=|repealed=y|archived=n|}}
| {{|Drainage Haddenham Level Act 1726|public|18|17-01-1727|note3=|repealed=y|archived=n|}}
| {{|Dyeing Trade Act 1726|public|24|17-01-1727|note3=|repealed=y|archived=n|}}
| {{|Fisheries (Scotland) Act 1726|note1=|public|30|17-01-1727|note3=|repealed=y|archived=n|}}
| {{|Hertfordshire Roads Act 1726|public|32|17-01-1727|note3=|repealed=y|archived=n|}}
| {{|Importation Act 1726|public|5|17-01-1727|note3=|repealed=y|archived=n|}}
| {{|Importation Act 1726|public|25|17-01-1727|note3=|repealed=y|archived=n|}}
| {{|Land Tax Act 1726|public|1|17-01-1727|note3=|repealed=y|archived=n|}}
| {{|Linen and Hempen Manufactures (Scotland) Act 1726|note1=|public|26|17-01-1727|note3=|repealed=y|archived=n|}}
| {{|Luton and Saint Albans Road Act 1726|public|17|17-01-1727|note3=|repealed=y|archived=n|}}
| {{|Mutiny Act 1726|public|2|17-01-1727|note3=|repealed=y|archived=n|}}
| {{|National Debt Act 1726|public|3|17-01-1727|note3=|repealed=y|archived=n|}}
| {{|National Debt Act 1726|public|21|17-01-1727|note3=|repealed=y|archived=n|}}
| {{|Poor Relief: Gloucester Act 1726|note1=|public|19|17-01-1727|note3=|repealed=y|archived=n|}}
| {{|Qualification for Employments Act 1726|public|29|17-01-1727|note3=|repealed=y|archived=n|An Act for allowing further Time to Persons on board the Fleet, or beyond the Seas in his Majesty's Service, to qualify themselves for the legal Enjoyment of Offices and Employments, and for indemnifying such Persons as have omitted to qualify themselves within the Time limited for that Purpose, and for the better ascertaining such Time.}}
| {{|River Dun, York: Navigation Act 1726|public|20|17-01-1727|note3=|repealed=y|archived=n|}}
| {{|Ouse Navigation Act 1726|note1= This Act is variously dated 1726 or 1727.|public|33|17-01-1727|note3=|repealed=y|archived=n|}}
| {{|Rivers Lugg and Wye, Hereford: Navigation Act 1726|public|34|17-01-1727|note3=|repealed=y|archived=n|}}
| {{|Saint Catherine Cree Church Act 1726|public|35|17-01-1727|note3=|repealed=y|archived=n|}}
| {{|South Sea Company Act 1726|public|8|17-01-1727|note3=|repealed=y|archived=n|}}
| {{|South Sea Company Act 1726|public|22|17-01-1727|note3=|repealed=y|archived=n|}}
| {{|Sunderland Port Act 1726|public|6|17-01-1727|note3=|repealed=y|archived=n|}}
| {{|Taxation, etc. Act 1726|public|7|17-01-1727|note3=|repealed=y|archived=n|}}
| {{|Warminster Roads Act 1726|public|16|17-01-1727|note3=|repealed=y|archived=n|}}
| {{|Warrington and Wigan Road Act 1726|public|10|17-01-1727|note3=|repealed=y|archived=n|}}
| {{|Wigan to Preston Roads Act 1726|public|9|17-01-1727|note3=|repealed=y|archived=n|}}
| {{|Woollen Manufacture Act 1726|public|23|17-01-1727|note3=|repealed=y|archived=n|}}
}}

Private Acts

}}

1727

1 Geo. 2 St. 1

| {{|Demise of the Crown Act 1727|note1=|public|5|27-06-1727|note3=|repealed=n|archived=n|An Act ... for altering and explaining the Acts of Parliament therein mentioned, in relation to qualifying Persons for continuing in Offices, ... after the Demise of his late Majesty, his Heirs and Successors ...}}
| {{|Imprisonment of Certain Traitors Act 1727|public|4|27-06-1727|note3=|repealed=y|archived=n|}}
| {{|Provision for the Queen Act 1727|public|3|27-06-1727|note3=|repealed=y|archived=n|}}
| {{|South Sea Company Act 1727|public|2|27-06-1727|note3=|repealed=y|archived=n|}}
}}

1 Geo. 2 St. 2

| {{|Bedford and Buckingham Roads Act 1727|public|10|23-01-1728|note3=|repealed=y|archived=n|}}
| {{|Canterbury: Poor Relief Act 1727|public|20|23-01-1728|note3=|repealed=y|archived=n|}}
| {{|Crown Lands – Forfeited Estates Act 1727|public|21|23-01-1728|note3=|repealed=y|archived=n|}}
| {{|Customs, etc. Act 1727|public|17|23-01-1728|note3=|repealed=y|archived=n|}}
| {{|Destruction of Turnpikes, etc. Act 1727|public|19|23-01-1728|note3=|repealed=y|archived=n|}}
| {{|Egham and Bagshot Roads Act 1727|public|6|23-01-1728|note3=|repealed=y|archived=n|}}
| {{|Evesham Roads Act 1727|public|11|23-01-1728|note3=|repealed=y|archived=n|}}
| {{|Excise Act 1727|public|16|23-01-1728|note3=|repealed=y|archived=n|}}
| {{|Fulham Bridge Act 1727|public|18|23-01-1728|note3=|repealed=y|archived=n|}}
| {{|Fund for Fire Victims in Edinburgh Act 1727|public|22|23-01-1728|note3=|repealed=y|archived=n|}}
| {{|Huntingdonshire Roads Act 1727|public|4|23-01-1728|note3=|repealed=y|archived=n|}}
| {{|Indemnity Act 1727|public|23|23-01-1728|note3=|repealed=y|archived=n|}}
| {{|Land Tax Act 1727|public|5|23-01-1728|note3=|repealed=y|archived=n|}}
| {{|Maidenhead and Reading, etc., Roads Act 1727|public|3|23-01-1728|note3=|repealed=y|archived=n|}}
| {{|Milbank New Church Act 1727|public|15|23-01-1728|note3=|repealed=y|archived=n|}}
| {{|Mutiny Act 1727|public|2|23-01-1728|note3=|repealed=y|archived=n|}}
| {{|Navy Act 1727|public|14|23-01-1728|note3=|repealed=y|archived=n|}}
| {{|Quarantine Act 1727|public|13|23-01-1728|note3=|repealed=y|archived=n|}}
| {{|Reading Roads Act 1727|public|7|23-01-1728|note3=|repealed=y|archived=n|}}
| {{|Rochester to Maidstone Road Act 1727|public|12|23-01-1728|note3=|repealed=y|archived=n|}}
| {{|Taxation Act 1727|public|1|23-01-1728|note3=|repealed=y|archived=n|}}
| {{|Taxation, etc. Act 1727|public|9|23-01-1728|note3=|repealed=y|archived=n|}}
}}

1728 (2 Geo. 2)

| {{|Bank of England Act 1728|note1=|public|3|21-01-1729|note3=|repealed=y|archived=n|}}
| {{|Brickmaking Act 1728|public|15|21-01-1729|note3=|repealed=y|archived=n|}}
| {{|Collegiate Church of Manchester Act 1728|public|29|21-01-1729|note3=|repealed=y|archived=n|}}
| {{|Corrupt Practices at Parliamentary Elections Act 1728|public|24|21-01-1729|note3=|repealed=y|archived=n|}}
| {{|Crown Lands – Forfeited Estates Act 1728|public|33|21-01-1729|note3=|repealed=y|archived=n|}}
| {{|Customs, etc. Act 1728|public|18|21-01-1729|note3=|repealed=y|archived=n|}}
| {{|Exchequer Act 1728|public|6|21-01-1729|note3=|repealed=y|archived=n|}}
| {{|Greenwich Hospital Act 1728|public|7|21-01-1729|note3=|repealed=y|archived=n|}}
| {{|Importation Act 1728|public|9|21-01-1729|note3=|repealed=y|archived=n|}}
| {{|Indemnity Act 1728|public|31|21-01-1729|note3=|repealed=y|archived=n|}}
| {{|Insolvent Debtors Relief Act 1728|public|20|21-01-1729|note3=|repealed=y|archived=n|}}
| {{|Insolvent Debtors Relief Act 1728|public|22|21-01-1729|note3=|repealed=y|archived=n|}}
| {{|Land Tax Act 1728|public|4|21-01-1729|note3=|repealed=y|archived=n|}}
| {{|Leominster Roads Act 1728|public|13|21-01-1729|note3=|repealed=y|archived=n|}}
| {{|Lichfield Roads Act 1728|public|5|21-01-1729|note3=|repealed=y|archived=n|}}
| {{|Medway Oyster Fishery Act 1728|note1=|public|19|21-01-1729|note3=|repealed=y|archived=n|}}
| {{|Merchant Seamen Act 1728|public|36|21-01-1729|note3=|repealed=y|archived=n|}}
| {{|Murder Act 1728|public|21|21-01-1729|note3=|repealed=y|archived=n|}}
| {{|Parish: Spittlefields, Stepney Act 1727|note1=|public|10|21-01-1729|note3=|repealed=y|archived=n|An Act for making the Hamlet of Spittle-fields in the Parish of Saint Dunstan Stebunheath, alias Stepney, in the County of Middlesex, a distinct Parish, and for providing a Maintenance for the Minister of such new Parish)}}
| {{|Perjury Act 1728|public|25|21-01-1729|note3=|repealed=y|archived=n|An Act for the more effectual preventing and further Punishment of Forgery, Perjury and Subornation of Perjury; and to make it Felony to steal Bonds, Notes or other Securities for Payment of Money.}}
| {{|Preservation of Woods, America Act 1728|public|35|21-01-1729|note3=|repealed=y|archived=n|}}
| {{|Province of Carolina Act 1728|public|34|21-01-1729|note3=|repealed=y|archived=n|}}
| {{|Regency During the King's Absence Act 1728|public|27|21-01-1729|note3=|repealed=y|archived=n|}}
| {{|Mutiny Act 1728|public|2|21-01-1729|note3=|repealed=y|archived=n|}}
| {{|Shoreditch and Enfield Roads Act 1728|public|14|21-01-1729|note3=|repealed=y|archived=n|}}
| {{|South Sea Company Act 1728|public|8|21-01-1729|note3=|repealed=y|archived=n|}}
| {{|Taxation Act 1728|public|1|21-01-1729|note3=|repealed=y|archived=n|}}
| {{|Taxation Act 1728|public|17|21-01-1729|note3=|repealed=y|archived=n|}}
| {{|Thames Watermen Act 1728|public|26|21-01-1729|note3=|repealed=y|archived=n|}}
| {{|Trinity Chapel, Leeds Act 1728|public|16|21-01-1729|note3=|repealed=y|archived=n|}}
| {{|Unlawful Games Act 1728|note1=|public|28|21-01-1729|note3=|repealed=y|archived=n|}}
| {{|Wapping, Stepney Act 1728|public|30|21-01-1729|note3=|repealed=y|archived=n|}}
| {{|Warden of Fleet Prison Act 1728|public|32|21-01-1729|note3=|repealed=y|archived=n|}}
| {{|Westminster Streets Act 1728|public|11|21-01-1729|note3=|repealed=y|archived=n|}}
| {{|Wiltshire Highway Act 1728|public|12|21-01-1729|note3=|repealed=y|archived=n|}}
}}

1729 (3 Geo. 2)

| {{|Bloomsbury Churches Act 1729|public|19|13-01-1730|note3=|repealed=y|archived=n|}}
| {{|Brickmaking Act 1729|public|22|13-01-1730|note3=|repealed=y|archived=n|}}
| {{|Bridgwater Roads Act 1729|public|34|13-01-1730|note3=|repealed=y|archived=n|}}
| {{|Brokers, Bristol Act 1729|public|31|13-01-1730|note3=|repealed=y|archived=n|}}
| {{|Buxton to Manchester Road Act 1729|public|4|13-01-1730|note3=|repealed=y|archived=n|}}
| {{|Cambridge Roads Act 1729|public|37|13-01-1730|note3=|repealed=y|archived=n|}}
| {{|Cambridgeshire Roads Act 1729|public|24|13-01-1730|note3=|repealed=y|archived=n|}}
| {{|Coal Trade Act 1729|public|26|13-01-1730|note3=|repealed=y|archived=n|}}
| {{|Colonial Trade Act 1729|public|28|13-01-1730|note3=|repealed=y|archived=n|}}
| {{|East India Company Act 1729|public|14|13-01-1730|note3=|repealed=y|archived=n|}}
| {{|Execution of Sentences (Scotland) Act 1729|note1=|public|32|13-01-1730|note3=|repealed=y|archived=n|}}
| {{|Juries Act 1729|public|25|13-01-1730|note3=|repealed=y|archived=n|}}
| {{|Hereford (City) Roads Act 1729|public|18|13-01-1730|note3=|repealed=y|archived=n|}}
| {{|Importation Act 1729|public|12|13-01-1730|note3=|repealed=y|archived=n|}}
| {{|Insolvent Debtors Relief Act 1729|public|27|13-01-1730|note3=|repealed=y|archived=n|}}
| {{|Kent Roads Act 1729|public|15|13-01-1730|note3=|repealed=y|archived=n|}}
| {{|Land Tax Act 1729|public|1|13-01-1730|note3=|repealed=y|archived=n|}}
| {{|Limehouse, Stepney: Parish Act 1729|public|17|13-01-1730|note3=|repealed=y|archived=n|}}
| {{|Middlesex and Hertford Roads Act 1729|public|10|13-01-1730|note3=|repealed=y|archived=n|}}
| {{|Mutiny Act 1729|public|2|13-01-1730|note3=|repealed=y|archived=n|}}
| {{|National Debt Act 1729|public|16|13-01-1730|note3=|repealed=y|archived=n|}}
| {{|Orders, etc., of the Master of the Rolls Act 1729|public|30|13-01-1730|note3=|repealed=y|archived=n|}}
| {{|Oxfordshire Roads Act 1729|public|21|13-01-1730|note3=|repealed=y|archived=n|}}
| {{|Parliamentary Elections, Norwich Act 1729|public|8|13-01-1730|note3=|repealed=y|archived=n|}}
| {{|Price of Bread, etc. Act 1729|public|29|13-01-1730|note3=|repealed=y|archived=n|}}
| {{|River Kennet, Berkshire: Navigation Act 1729|public|35|13-01-1730|note3=|repealed=y|archived=n|}}
| {{|Saint Mary Stratford Bow Church Act 1729|public|3|13-01-1730|note3=|repealed=y|archived=n|}}
| {{|Saint Nicholas, Deptford: Parish Act 1729|public|33|13-01-1730|note3=|repealed=y|archived=n|}}
| {{|Salt Duties Act 1729|public|20|13-01-1730|note3=|repealed=y|archived=n|}}
| {{|Shropshire Roads Act 1729|public|6|13-01-1730|note3=|repealed=y|archived=n|}}
| {{|Skerries Lighthouse Act 1729|public|36|13-01-1730|note3=|repealed=y|archived=n|}}
| {{|Stroudwater Navigation Act 1729|public|13|13-01-1730|note3=|repealed=y|archived=n|}}
| {{|Taxation, etc. Act 1729|public|7|13-01-1730|note3=|repealed=y|archived=n|}}
| {{|Thames Navigation Act 1729|public|11|13-01-1730|note3=|repealed=y|archived=n|}}
| {{|Warwick Roads Act 1729|public|9|13-01-1730|note3=|repealed=y|archived=n|}}
| {{|Worcester: Poor Relief, Burial Ground and Hopmarket Act 1729|public|23|13-01-1730|note3=|repealed=y|archived=n|}}
}}

1730-1739

1730 (4 Geo. 2)

Public Acts

| {{|Adulteration of Tea Act 1730|note1=|public|14|21-01-1731|note3=|repealed=y|archived=n|An Act to prevent frauds in the revenue of excise, with respect to starch, coffee, tea, and chocolate.}}
| {{|Bristol Roads Act 1730|public|22|21-01-1731|note3=|repealed=y|archived=n|}}
| {{|British Nationality Act 1730|note1=|public|21|21-01-1731|note3=|repealed=y|archived=n|An Act to explain a clause in an act made in the seventh year of the reign of her late majesty Queen Anne (for naturalizing foreign protestants) which relates to the children of the natural-born subjects of the crown of England, or of Great Britain.}}
| {{|Cheshire Roads Act 1730|public|3|21-01-1731|note3=|repealed=y|archived=n|}}
| {{|Church at Gravesend Act 1730|public|20|21-01-1731|note3=|repealed=y|archived=n|An Act for rebuilding the parish church of Gravesend in the County of Kent, as one of the Fifty New Churches directed to be built by two Acts Of Parliament, one made in the Ninth, and the other in the Tenth year of the Reign of her late majesty Queen Anne.}}
| {{|Coal Trade Act 1730|public|30|21-01-1731|note3=|repealed=y|archived=n|}}
| {{|Coinage Duties Act 1730|public|12|21-01-1731|note3=|repealed=y|archived=n|An Act to continue the duties for encouragement of the coinage of money.}}
| {{|Dundee Beer Duties Act 1730|public|11|21-01-1731|note3=|repealed=y|archived=n|}}
| {{|Exportation Act 1730|public|29|21-01-1731|note3=|repealed=y|archived=n|An Act for granting an allowance upon the exportation of British made gunpowder.}}
| {{|Fulham Roads Act 1730|public|34|21-01-1731|note3=|repealed=y|archived=n|}}
| {{|Ilfracombe Harbour Act 1730|public|19|21-01-1731|note3=|repealed=y|archived=n|}}
| {{|Importation Act 1730|public|15|21-01-1731|note3=|repealed=y|archived=n|}}
| {{|Indemnity Act 1730|public|6|21-01-1731|note3=|repealed=y|archived=n|}}
| {{|Juries Act 1730|public|7|21-01-1731|note3=|repealed=y|archived=n|}}
| {{|Lancashire Roads Act 1730|public|31|21-01-1731|note3=|repealed=y|archived=n|}}
| {{|Landlord and Tenant Act 1730|public|28|21-01-1731|note3=|repealed=n|archived=n|An Act for the more effectual preventing Frauds committed by Tenants, and for the more easy Recovery of Rents, and Renewal of Leases.}}
| {{|Land Tax Act 1730|public|4|21-01-1731|note3=|repealed=y|archived=n|}}
| {{|Lunatics Act 1730|public|10|21-01-1731|note3=|repealed=y|archived=n|An Act to enable ideots and lunaticks, who are possessed of estates in fee, or for lives, or terms of years, in trust, or by way of mortgage, to make conveyances, surrenders, or assignments of such estates.}}
| {{|Manufacture of Sail Cloth Act 1730|public|27|21-01-1731|note3=|repealed=y|archived=n|}}
| {{|Mediterranean Passes Act 1730|public|18|21-01-1731|note3=|repealed=y|archived=n|An Act to prevent counterfeiting the passes commonly called Mediterranean passes.}}
| {{|Mutiny Act 1730|public|2|21-01-1731|note3=|repealed=y|archived=n|}}
| {{|National Debt Act 1730|public|5|21-01-1731|note3=|repealed=y|archived=n|An Act for the further application of the sinking-fund, by paying off one million of South-Sea annuities.}}
| {{|National Debt Act 1730|public|9|21-01-1731|note3=|repealed=y|archived=n|An Act for raising one million two hundred thousand pounds by annuities, and a lottery, in manner therein mentioned, and for appropriating the supplies granted in this session of parliament, and for making forth duplicates of exchequer billers, lottery-tickets, and orders lost, burnt, or otherwise destroyed.}}
| {{|Newhaven Harbour Act 1730|public|17|21-01-1731|note3=|repealed=y|archived=n|}}
| {{|Oxford and Gloucester Roads Act 1730|public|23|21-01-1731|note3=|repealed=y|archived=n|}}
| {{|Postage Act 1730|public|33|21-01-1731|note3=|repealed=y|archived=n|}}
| {{|Proceedings in Courts of Justice Act 1730|public|26|21-01-1731|note3=|repealed=y|archived=n|An Act that all Proceedings in the Courts of Justice within that Part of Great Britain called England, and in the Court of Exchequer in Scotland, shall be in the English Language.}}
| {{|Stealing from Bleaching Grounds Act 1730|public|16|21-01-1731|note3=|repealed=y|archived=n|}}
| {{|Surrey and Sussex Roads Act 1730|public|8|21-01-1731|note3=|repealed=y|archived=n|}}
| {{|Taxation Act 1730|public|1|21-01-1731|note3=|repealed=y|archived=n|}}
| {{|Thames Watermen Act 1730|public|24|21-01-1731|note3=|repealed=y|archived=n|}}
| {{|Theft Act 1730|note1=|public|32|21-01-1731|note3=|repealed=y|archived=n|}}
| {{|Worcester: Poor Relief, Burial Ground and Hopmarket Act 1730|public|25|21-01-1731|note3=|repealed=y|archived=n|}}
}}

Private Acts

| {{|Naturalization of Philip Jacob de Neufville and others.|private|2|21-01-1731|note3=|repealed=n|archived=n|}}
| {{|Bishop's Tachbrook (Warwickshire) inclosure.|private|3|21-01-1731|note3=|repealed=n|archived=n|}}
| {{|Richard Claridge: enabling him and issue to take the surname Turner.|private|4|21-01-1731|note3=|repealed=n|archived=n|}}
| {{|Naturalization of Hieronimus de Salis Act 1731|private|5|21-01-1731|note3=|repealed=n|archived=n|An act to naturalize Hieronymus de Salis esq.}}
| {{|Naturalization of Catherina Godolphin.|private|6|21-01-1731|note3=|repealed=n|archived=n|}}
| {{|Naturalization of Mary Anne de la Fontaine.|private|7|21-01-1731|note3=|repealed=n|archived=n|}}
| {{|Vesting lands in James Duke of Chandos in pursuance of an agreement made on his son Henry Marquis of Caernarvon's marriage.|private|8|21-01-1731|note3=|repealed=n|archived=n|}}
| {{|Nuneaton and Attleborough (Warwickshire) inclosures.|private|9|21-01-1731|note3=|repealed=n|archived=n|}}
| {{|Prestbury (Gloucestershire) inclosure.|private|10|21-01-1731|note3=|repealed=n|archived=n|}}
| {{|John Shafto's estate: provision for a future wife and younger children.|private|11|21-01-1731|note3=|repealed=n|archived=n|}}
| {{|Sale of the estate in Buckinghamshire late of Mary Clayton, entailed by her will, for payment of debts and legacies and purchase and settlement of other lands to the like uses.|private|12|21-01-1731|note3=|repealed=n|archived=n|}}
| {{|Naturalization of Isaac Lacam, Peter Korten and others.|private|13|21-01-1731|note3=|repealed=n|archived=n|}}
| {{|Charles Duke of Grafton's estate: sale of lands in Surrey and settling of others in lieu.|private|14|21-01-1731|note3=|repealed=n|archived=n|}}
| {{|Thomas Taylor's and Maurice Shelton's estates: sale of lands in Suffolk and settling others.|private|15|21-01-1731|note3=|repealed=n|archived=n|}}
| {{|Making divisions, inclosures and allotments in Catwick (Yorkshire) and establishing a yearly payment to the rector there in lieu of tithes.|private|16|21-01-1731|note3=|repealed=n|archived=n|}}
| {{|Exchange of the parsonage house and glebe of Biscathorpe (Lincolnshire) for lands belonging to the lord of the manor and recompense to the rector in lieu of his tithes, to enable the lord of the manor to inclose the common fields.|private|17|21-01-1731|note3=|repealed=n|archived=n|}}
| {{|Lower and Upper Slaughter (Gloucestershire) inclosure.|private|18|21-01-1731|note3=|repealed=n|archived=n|}}
| {{|Manor of West Broughton in Dovebridge (Derbyshire) inclosure.|private|19|21-01-1731|note3=|repealed=n|archived=n|}}
| {{|Sir Hungerford Hoskyn's estate: vesting certain estates in trustees to be sold for payment of debts, his father's incumbrances and portions for siblings.|private|20|21-01-1731|note3=|repealed=n|archived=n|}}
| {{|Exchange of estates between Lancelot Archbishop of York and John Aislabie.|private|21|21-01-1731|note3=|repealed=n|archived=n|}}
| {{|Enabling Frances Arundell and George Henry, Earl of Litchfield, guardian of Mary Arundell (an infant) to grant and fill up leases of estates of Mary and Frances Arundell in Cornwall and Dorset.|private|22|21-01-1731|note3=|repealed=n|archived=n|}}
| {{|Exemplifying Henry Lord Herbert's will and making it evidence in all law courts in Great Britain and Ireland.|private|23|21-01-1731|note3=|repealed=n|archived=n|}}
| {{|Exemplifying Henry Bagenall's will and making it evidence in all law courts in Great Britain and Ireland.|private|24|21-01-1731|note3=|repealed=n|archived=n|}}
| {{|Confirming agreements for exchange of lands between Edmund Halsey, deceased, and the patron and vicar of Stoke Poges (Buckinghamshire).|private|25|21-01-1731|note3=|repealed=n|archived=n|}}
| {{|Thomas Player's estate: sale of part for payment of debts, incumbrances and legacies.|private|26|21-01-1731|note3=|repealed=n|archived=n|}}
| {{|Sale of the estates of Edward Standen (deceased) at Arborfield and elsewhere for payment of debts.|private|27|21-01-1731|note3=|repealed=n|archived=n|}}
| {{|Lucy and John (her son) Bowry's estate: sale of lands in Edmonton and Tottenham (Middlesex) for discharge of incumbrances.|private|28|21-01-1731|note3=|repealed=n|archived=n|}}
| {{|Robert Westby's estate: sale of part in Lancashire for payment of debts and father's and brother's incumbrances.|private|29|21-01-1731|note3=|repealed=n|archived=n|}}
| {{|Enabling Reymunde Putt to make and fill up leases of Sir Thomas Putt's estates in Devon, Dorset and Somerset.|private|30|21-01-1731|note3=|repealed=n|archived=n|}}
| {{|Vesting in John Inglis, executor of George Heriot, lands in Hampshire mortgaged in fee by Charles Bulkley to the testator, in trust for purposes mentioned.|private|31|21-01-1731|note3=|repealed=n|archived=n|}}
| {{|Godfrey Kneller Huckle: enabling him to take the surname Kneller.|private|32|21-01-1731|note3=|repealed=n|archived=n|}}
| {{|Naturalization of Ernst Bardewieck.|private|33|21-01-1731|note3=|repealed=n|archived=n|}}
}}

1731 (5 Geo. 2)

| {{|Bedford Roads. Act 1731|public|26|13-01-1732|note3=|repealed=y|archived=n|}}
| {{|Blandford Forum (Rebuilding After the Fire) Act 1731|public|16|13-01-1732|note3=|repealed=y|archived=n|}}
| {{|Charitable Corporation (Claims and Disputes) Act 1731|public|31|13-01-1732|note3=|repealed=y|archived=n|}}
| {{|Charitable Corporation Frauds Act 1731|public|3|13-01-1732|note3=|repealed=y|archived=n|}}
| {{|Church at Woolwich Act 1731|public|4|13-01-1732|note3=|repealed=y|archived=n|}}
| {{|Corn Act 1731|public|12|13-01-1732|note3=|repealed=y|archived=n|}}
| {{|Destruction of Turnpikes, etc. Act 1731|public|33|13-01-1732|note3=|repealed=y|archived=n|}}
| {{|Equity Procedure Act 1731|public|25|13-01-1732|note3=|repealed=y|archived=n|}}
| {{|Forfeited Estates – Derwentwater Estate Act 1731|public|23|13-01-1732|note3=|repealed=y|archived=n|}}
| {{|Greenland Fishery Act 1731|public|28|13-01-1732|note3=|repealed=y|archived=n|}}
| {{|Growth of Coffee Act 1731|public|24|13-01-1732|note3=|repealed=y|archived=n|}}
| {{|Hat Act 1731|note1= (sometimes called the Hat Manufacture Act 1731 or the Hat Act 1732)|public|22|13-01-1732|note3=|repealed=y|archived=n|An Act to prevent the Exportation of Hats out of any of His Majesty's Colonies, or Plantations in America, and to restrain the Number of Apprentices taken by Hatmakers in the said Colonies or Plantations, and for the better encouraging the making Hats in Great Britain.}}
| {{|Importation Act 1731|public|9|13-01-1732|note3=|repealed=y|archived=n|}}
| {{|Justices Qualification Act 1731|note1=|public|18|13-01-1732|note3=|repealed=y|archived=n|}}
| {{|Local Tax Act 1731|public|5|13-01-1732|note3=|repealed=y|archived=n|}}
| {{|Lombs's Silk Engines Act 1731|public|8|13-01-1732|note3=|repealed=y|archived=n|An Act for providing a Recompence for Sir Thomas Lombe, for discovering and introducing the Arts of making and working the three Capital Italian Engines for making Organzine Silk, and for preserving the Invention for the Benefit of this Kingdom.}}
| {{|Manchester Roads Act 1731|public|10|13-01-1732|note3=|repealed=y|archived=n|}}
| {{|Mutiny Act 1731|public|2|13-01-1732|note3=|repealed=y|archived=n|}}
| {{|National Debt Act 1731|public|17|13-01-1732|note3=|repealed=y|archived=n|}}
| {{|Ouze (Yorkshire) Navigation Act 1731|public|15|13-01-1732|note3=|repealed=y|archived=n|}}
| {{|Parton Harbour, Cumberland Act 1731|public|13|13-01-1732|note3=|repealed=y|archived=n|}}
| {{|Pilotage Act 1731|public|20|13-01-1732|note3=|repealed=y|archived=n|}}
| {{|Process for Small Debts Act 1731|public|27|13-01-1732|note3=|repealed=y|archived=n|}}
| {{|Quarter Sessions Appeal Act 1731|note1=|public|19|13-01-1732|note3=|repealed=y|archived=n|}}
| {{|Recovery of Debts in American Plantations Act 1731|note1= (or the Debt Recovery Act 1732)|public|7|13-01-1732|note3=|repealed=y|archived=n|An Act for the more easy Recovery of Debts in His Majesty's Plantations and Colonies in America.}}
| {{|Salt Duties Act 1731|public|6|13-01-1732|note3=|repealed=y|archived=n|}}
| {{|Scarborough Harbour Act 1731|public|11|13-01-1732|note3=|repealed=y|archived=n|}}
| {{|Sir Robert Sutton, etc., Restrained from Going Abroad Act 1731|public|32|13-01-1732|note3=|repealed=y|archived=n|}}
| {{|Taxation Act 1731|public|1|13-01-1732|note3=|repealed=y|archived=n|}}
| {{|Tiverton (Rebuilding After the Fire) Act 1731|public|14|13-01-1732|note3=|repealed=y|archived=n|}}
| {{|Trade to East Indies Act 1731|public|29|13-01-1732|note3=|repealed=y|archived=n|}}
| {{|Woollen Manufactures Act 1731|public|21|13-01-1732|note3=|repealed=y|archived=n|}}
}}

1732 (6 Geo. 2)

| {{|Bastard Children Act 1732|public|31|16-01-1733|note3=|repealed=y|archived=n|}}
| {{|Berkshire Roads Act 1732|public|16|16-01-1733|note3=|repealed=y|archived=n|}}
| {{|Charitable Corporation Act 1732|public|2|16-01-1733|note3=|repealed=y|archived=n|}}
| {{|Charitable Corporation (Arrangements with Creditors) Act 1732|public|36|16-01-1733|note3=|repealed=y|archived=n|}}
| {{|Church of Saint George, Southwark Act 1732|public|8|16-01-1733|note3=|repealed=y|archived=n|}}
| {{|Coin Act 1732|public|26|16-01-1733|note3=|repealed=y|archived=n|An Act to prevent the coining or counterfeiting any of the gold coins commonly called Broad Pieces."}}
| {{|Courts in Wales and Chester Act 1732|public|14|16-01-1733|note3=|repealed=y|archived=n|}}
| {{|Cripplegate: Church Building Act 1732|public|21|16-01-1733|note3=|repealed=y|archived=n|}}
| {{|Exportation Act 1732|public|38|16-01-1733|note3=|repealed=y|archived=n|}}
| {{|Fleet Ditch Act 1732|public|22|16-01-1733|note3=|repealed=y|archived=n|}}
| {{|Hertford and Ware Roads Act 1732|public|15|16-01-1733|note3=|repealed=y|archived=n|}}
| {{|Hertfordshire Roads Act 1732|public|24|16-01-1733|note3=|repealed=y|archived=n|}}
| {{|Holdings of County Courts Act 1732|public|23|16-01-1733|note3=|repealed=y|archived=n|}}
| {{|Horsleydown Parish Act 1732|public|11|16-01-1733|note3=|repealed=y|archived=n|}}
| {{|Importation Act 1732|public|7|16-01-1733|note3=|repealed=y|archived=n|}}
| {{|Indemnity Act 1732|public|4|16-01-1733|note3=|repealed=y|archived=n|}}
| {{|Land Tax Act 1732|public|10|16-01-1733|note3=|repealed=y|archived=n|}}
| {{|Linlithgow Beer Duties Act 1732|public|18|16-01-1733|note3=|repealed=y|archived=n|}}
| {{|Littlehampton Harbour Act 1732|public|12|16-01-1733|note3=|repealed=y|archived=n|}}
| {{|Lotteries Act 1732|note1=|public|35|16-01-1733|note3=|repealed=y|archived=n|}}
| {{|Mutiny Act 1732|public|3|16-01-1733|note3=|repealed=y|archived=n|}}
| {{|National Debt Act 1732|public|28|16-01-1733|note3=|repealed=y|archived=n|}}
| {{|Papists Act 1732|public|5|16-01-1733|note3=|repealed=y|archived=n|An Act for allowing further time for the Inrolment of Deeds and Wills made by Papists, and for Relief of Protestant Purchasers and Lessees.}}
| {{|Perpetuation of Various Laws Act 1732|public|37|16-01-1733|note3=|repealed=y|archived=n|}}
| {{|Receipt of the Exchequer Act 1732|public|6|16-01-1733|note3=|repealed=y|archived=n|}}
| {{|Richard Norton's Will Act 1732|public|32|16-01-1733|note3=|repealed=y|archived=n|}}
| {{|Quarantine Act 1732|public|34|16-01-1733|note3=|repealed=y|archived=n|}}
| {{|River Dee Navigation Act 1732|public|30|16-01-1733|note3=|repealed=y|archived=n|}}
| {{|River Dun, York: Navigation Act 1732|public|9|16-01-1733|note3=|repealed=y|archived=n|}}
| {{|River Thames Lastage and Ballastage Act 1732|public|29|16-01-1733|note3=|repealed=y|archived=n|}}
| {{|Spirit Duties Act 1732|public|17|16-01-1733|note3=|repealed=y|archived=n|}}
| {{|Suffolk Roads Act 1732|public|20|16-01-1733|note3=|repealed=y|archived=n|}}
| {{|Supply, etc. Act 1732|public|25|16-01-1733|note3=|repealed=y|archived=n|}}
| {{|Taxation Act 1732|public|1|16-01-1733|note3=|repealed=y|archived=n|}}
| {{|Tiverton Chapel Act 1732|public|19|16-01-1733|note3=|repealed=y|archived=n|}}
| {{|Trade of Sugar Colonies Act 1732|note1= or the Molasses Act 1733|public|13|16-01-1733|note3=|repealed=y|archived=n|An act for the better securing and encouraging the trade of his Majesty's sugar colonies in America.}}
| {{|Whale Fishery Act 1732|public|33|16-01-1733|note3=|repealed=y|archived=n|}}
}}

1733 (7 Geo. 2)

| {{|Assaults with Intent to Rob Act 1733|public|21|07-01-1734|note3=|repealed=y|archived=n|}}
| {{|Charitable Corporation Lottery Act 1733|public|11|07-01-1734|note3=|repealed=y|archived=n|}}
| {{|Church at Coventry Act 1733|public|27|07-01-1734|note3=|repealed=y|archived=n|}}
| {{|Cloth Manufacture Act 1733|public|25|07-01-1734|note3=|repealed=y|archived=n|}}
| {{|Forgery Act 1733|public|22|07-01-1734|note3=|repealed=y|archived=n|}}
| {{|Highways Act 1733|public|9|07-01-1734|note3=|repealed=y|archived=n|}}
| {{|Importation Act 1733|public|18|07-01-1734|note3=|repealed=y|archived=n|}}
| {{|Indemnity Act 1733|public|10|07-01-1734|note3=|repealed=y|archived=n|}}
| {{|Land Tax Act 1733|public|7|07-01-1734|note3=|repealed=y|archived=n|}}
| {{|Middlesex Roads Act 1733|public|26|07-01-1734|note3=|repealed=y|archived=n|}}
| {{|Militia Act 1733|public|23|07-01-1734|note3=|repealed=y|archived=n|}}
| {{|Montrose Beer Duties Act 1733|public|5|07-01-1734|note3=|repealed=y|archived=n|}}
| {{|Mortgage Act 1733|note1=|public|20|07-01-1734|note3=|repealed=y|archived=n|}}
| {{|Mutiny Act 1733|public|2|07-01-1734|note3=|repealed=y|archived=n|}}
| {{|Parliamentary Elections (Scotland) Act 1733|note1=|public|16|07-01-1734|note3=|repealed=y|archived=n|}}
| {{|Prince of Orange Act 1733|public|3|07-01-1734|note3=|repealed=y|archived=n|}}
| {{|Printing of Thuanus' Histories Act 1733|public|24|07-01-1734|note3=|repealed=y|archived=n|}}
| {{|Provision for the Princess Royal Act 1733|public|13|07-01-1734|note3=|repealed=y|archived=n|}}
| {{|Responsibility of Shipowners Act 1733|public|15|07-01-1734|note3=|repealed=y|archived=n|}}
| {{|River Weaver: Navigation Act 1733|public|28|07-01-1734|note3=|repealed=y|archived=n|}}
| {{|Roads, Hertfordshire and Huntingdonshire Act 1733|public|29|07-01-1734|note3=|repealed=y|archived=n|}}
| {{|Royal Family Act 1733|public|4|07-01-1734|note3=|repealed=y|archived=n|}}
| {{|Salt Duties Act 1733|public|6|07-01-1734|note3=|repealed=y|archived=n|}}
| {{|South Sea Company Act 1733|public|17|07-01-1734|note3=|repealed=y|archived=n|}}
| {{|Stock Jobbing Act 1733|public|8|07-01-1734|note3=|repealed=y|archived=n|}}
| {{|Supply, etc. Act 1733|public|12|07-01-1734|note3=|repealed=y|archived=n|}}
| {{|Taxation Act 1733|public|14|07-01-1734|note3=|repealed=y|archived=n|}}
| {{|Taxation, etc. Act 1733|public|1|07-01-1734|note3=|repealed=y|archived=n|}}
}}

1734 (8 Geo. 2)

| {{|Church of Saint Leonard, Shoreditch Act 1734|public|27|14-01-1735|note3=|repealed=y|archived=n|}}
| {{|Colonial Trade Act 1734|public|19|14-01-1735|note3=|repealed=y|archived=n|}}
| {{|Continuance of Acts, 1734|public|18|14-01-1735|note3=|repealed=y|archived=n|}}
| {{|Continuance of Laws Act 1734|public|21|14-01-1735|note3=|repealed=y|archived=n|}}
| {{|Destruction of Turnpikes, etc. Act 1734|public|20|14-01-1735|note3=|repealed=y|archived=n|}}
| {{|Engraving Copyright Act 1734|public|13|14-01-1735|note3=|repealed=y|archived=n|An act for the encouragement of the arts of designing, engraving, and etching historical and other prints, by vesting the properties thereof in the inventors and engravers, during the time therein mentioned.}}
| {{|Forfeited Estates – Greenwich Hospital Act 1734|public|29|14-01-1735|note3=|repealed=y|archived=n|}}
| {{|Highgate and Hampstead Roads Act 1734|public|28|14-01-1735|note3=|repealed=y|archived=n|}}
| {{|Hue and Cry Act 1734|public|16|14-01-1735|note3=|repealed=y|archived=n|}}
| {{|Indemnity Act 1734|public|4|14-01-1735|note3=|repealed=y|archived=n|}}
| {{|Indemnity Act 1734|public|17|14-01-1735|note3=|repealed=y|archived=n|}}
| {{|Land Tax Act 1734|public|23|14-01-1735|note3=|repealed=y|archived=n|}}
| {{|Late Earl of Seaforth Act 1734|public|22|14-01-1735|note3=|repealed=y|archived=n|}}
| {{|Lincoln's Inn Fields Rate Act 1734|note1=|public|26|14-01-1735|note3=|repealed=y|archived=n|}}
| {{|Marylebone Road Act 1734|public|8|14-01-1735|note3=|repealed=y|archived=n|}}
| {{|Mutiny Act 1734|public|2|14-01-1735|note3=|repealed=y|archived=n|}}
| {{|Night Watch Westminster Act 1734|public|15|14-01-1735|note3=|repealed=y|archived=n|}}
| {{|Papists Act 1734|public|25|14-01-1735|note3=|repealed=y|archived=n|An act to indemnify protestant purchasers of estates of papists, against the penalties or forfeitures papists are liable to for not having enrolled their estates, in pursuance of an act of the third year of king George the first for that purpose.}}
| {{|Parliamentary Elections Act 1734|public|30|14-01-1735|note3=|repealed=y|archived=n|}}
| {{|Roads, Hertfordshire and Middlesex Act 1734|public|9|14-01-1735|note3=|repealed=y|archived=n|}}
| {{|Roads, Yorkshire and Lancashire Act 1734|public|3|14-01-1735|note3=|repealed=y|archived=n|}}
| {{|Rochdale, Halifax and Ealand Road Act 1734|public|7|14-01-1735|note3=|repealed=y|archived=n|}}
| {{|Salt Duties, etc. Act 1734|public|12|14-01-1735|note3=|repealed=y|archived=n|}}
| {{|Set-off Act 1734|public|24|14-01-1735|note3=|repealed=y|archived=n|}}
| {{|Staffordshire Roads Act 1734|public|5|14-01-1735|note3=|repealed=y|archived=n|}}
| {{|Supply, etc. Act 1734|public|11|14-01-1735|note3=|repealed=y|archived=n|}}
| {{|Taxation Act 1734|public|1|14-01-1735|note3=|repealed=y|archived=n|}}
| {{|Whitby Harbour Act 1734|public|10|14-01-1735|note3=|repealed=y|archived=n|}}
| {{|Yorkshire (North Riding) Land Registry Act 1734|public|6|14-01-1735|note3=|repealed=y|archived=n|}}
}}

1735 (9 Geo. 2)

| {{|Buckinghamshire Roads Act 1735|public|21|15-01-1736|note3=|repealed=y|archived=n|}}
| {{|Charitable Uses Act 1735|note1=|public|36|15-01-1736|note3=|repealed=y|archived=n|}}
| {{|Continuance, etc., of Acts, 1735|public|18|15-01-1736|note3=|repealed=y|archived=n|}}
| {{|Corrupt Practices at Elections Act 1735|public|38|15-01-1736|note3=|repealed=y|archived=n|}}
| {{|Foreign Enlistment Act 1735|public|30|15-01-1736|note3=|repealed=y|archived=n|}}
| {{|Gainsborough Church Act 1735|public|22|15-01-1736|note3=|repealed=y|archived=n|}}
| {{|Glasgow Beer Duties Act 1735|public|31|15-01-1736|note3=|repealed=y|archived=n|}}
| {{|Indemnity Act 1735|public|6|15-01-1736|note3=|repealed=y|archived=n|}}
| {{|Indemnity, etc. Act 1735|public|26|15-01-1736|note3=|repealed=y|archived=n|}}
| {{|Irvine Beer Duties Act 1735|public|27|15-01-1736|note3=|repealed=y|archived=n|}}
| {{|Kent Roads Act 1735|public|7|15-01-1736|note3=|repealed=y|archived=n|}}
| {{|Kent Roads Act 1735|public|10|15-01-1736|note3=|repealed=y|archived=n|}}
| {{|Land Tax Act 1735|public|3|15-01-1736|note3=|repealed=y|archived=n|}}
| {{|Lobsters (Scotland) Act 1735|note1=|public|33|15-01-1736|note3=|repealed=y|archived=n|}}
| {{|Maidstone Gaol, Kent (Expenses) Act 1735|public|12|15-01-1736|note3=|repealed=y|archived=n|}}
| {{|Manchester Act 1736|note1= or the Woollen, etc. Manufacturers Act 1735<ref>Current Law Statutes 1996, [
| {{|Manufacture of Sail Cloth Act 1735|public|37|15-01-1736|note3=|repealed=y|archived=n|}}
| {{|Mutiny Act 1735|public|2|15-01-1736|note3=|repealed=y|archived=n|}}
| {{|National Debt Act 1735|public|34|15-01-1736|note3=|repealed=y|archived=n|}}
| {{|Northern Roads, London Act 1735|public|39|15-01-1736|note3=|repealed=y|archived=n|}}
| {{|Offences Against Customs and Excise Laws Act 1735|public|35|15-01-1736|note3=|repealed=y|archived=n|}}
| {{|Princess of Wales Act 1735|public|24|15-01-1736|note3=|repealed=y|archived=n|}}
| {{|Reading and Basingstoke Road Act 1735|public|16|15-01-1736|note3=|repealed=y|archived=n|}}
| {{|Relief of Shipwrecked Mariners Act 1735|public|25|15-01-1736|note3=|repealed=y|archived=n|}}
| {{|Roads, Bedfordshire and Huntingdonshire Act 1735|public|9|15-01-1736|note3=|repealed=y|archived=n|}}
| {{|Roads, Berkshire and Oxfordshire Act 1735|public|14|15-01-1736|note3=|repealed=y|archived=n|}}
| {{|Royal Family Act 1735|public|28|15-01-1736|note3=|repealed=y|archived=n|}}
| {{|Spirit Duties Act 1735|note1= (or the Gin Act 1736)|public|23|15-01-1736|note3=|repealed=y|archived=n|An Act for laying a Duty upon the Retalers of Spirituous Liquors, and for licensing the Retalers thereof.}}
| {{|Stamp Duties Act 1735|public|32|15-01-1736|note3=|repealed=y|archived=n|}}
| {{|Street Lighting, London Act 1735|public|20|15-01-1736|note3=|repealed=y|archived=n|}}
| {{|Taxation Act 1735|public|1|15-01-1736|note3=|repealed=y|archived=n|}}
| {{|Watching, Saint Margaret and Saint John, Westminster Act 1735|public|17|15-01-1736|note3=|repealed=y|archived=n|}}
| {{|Watching, Saint Martin's in the Fields Act 1735|public|8|15-01-1736|note3=|repealed=y|archived=n|}}
| {{|Watching, Saint Paul (Covent Garden) Act 1735|public|13|15-01-1736|note3=|repealed=y|archived=n|}}
| {{|Watching, Westminster Act 1735|public|19|15-01-1736|note3=|repealed=y|archived=n|}}
| {{|Westminster Bridge Act 1735|public|29|15-01-1736|note3=|repealed=y|archived=n|}}
| {{|Windsor Bridge Act 1735|public|15|15-01-1736|note3=|repealed=y|archived=n|}}
| {{|Witchcraft Act 1735|public|5|15-01-1736|note3=|repealed=y|archived=n|An Act to repeal the statute made in the first year of the reign of King James the First, intitutled, An Act against conjuration, witchcraft, and dealing with evil and wicked spirits, except so much thereof as repeals an Act of the fifth year of the reign of Queen Elizabeth, Against conjurations, inchantments and witchcrafts, and to repeal, an Act passed in the parliament of Scotland in the ninth parliament of Queen Mary, intituled, Anentis witchcrafts, and for punishing such persons as pretend to exercise or use any kind of witchcraft, sorcery, inchantment, or conjuration.}}
}}

1736 (10 Geo. 2)

| {{|Aylesbury Gaol and Shire Hall: Rate in Buckinghamshire Act 1736|note1=or the Aylesbury Gaol and Shire Hall Rate in Bucks Act 1736|public|10|01-02-1737|note3=|repealed=y|archived=n|}}
| {{|Bedfordshire Roads Act 1736|public|24|01-02-1737|note3=|repealed=y|archived=n|}}
| {{|Church of Abthorpe and Foxcoate, Northants Act 1736|note1=|public|21|01-02-1737|note3=|repealed=y|archived=n|}}
| {{|Church of Saint Olave, Southwark Act 1736|public|18|01-02-1737|note3=|repealed=y|archived=n|}}
| {{|Customs, etc. Act 1736|public|27|01-02-1737|note3=|repealed=y|archived=n|}}
| {{|Customs Act 1736|public|30|01-02-1737|note3=|repealed=y|archived=n|}}
| {{|Dumfries Beer Duties Act 1736|public|7|01-02-1737|note3=|repealed=y|archived=n|}}
| {{|Dunbar Beer Duties Act 1736|public|4|01-02-1737|note3=|repealed=y|archived=n|}}
| {{|Indemnity Act 1736|public|13|01-02-1737|note3=|repealed=y|archived=n|}}
| {{|Insolvent Debtors Relief Act 1736|public|26|01-02-1737|note3=|repealed=y|archived=n|}}
| {{|Land Tax Act 1736|public|3|01-02-1737|note3=|repealed=y|archived=n|}}
| {{|Murderers of Captain Porteous Act 1736|public|35|01-02-1737|note3=|repealed=y|archived=n|}}
| {{|Mutiny Act 1736|public|2|01-02-1737|note3=|repealed=y|archived=n|}}
| {{|National Debt Act 1736|public|17|01-02-1737|note3=|repealed=y|archived=n|}}
| {{|Offences Against Persons and Property Act 1736|public|32|01-02-1737|note3=|repealed=y|archived=n|}}
| {{|Plays and Wine Licences Act 1736|public|19|01-02-1737|note3=|repealed=y|archived=n|}}
| {{|Plays Act 1736|note1= (or the Licensing Act 1737)|public|28|01-02-1737|note3=|repealed=y|archived=n|}}
| {{|Prince and Princess of Wales Act 1736|public|29|01-02-1737|note3=|repealed=y|archived=n|}}
| {{|Relief of Shipwrecked Mariners Act 1736|public|14|01-02-1737|note3=|repealed=y|archived=n|}}
| {{|Richard Norton's Will Act 1736|public|37|01-02-1737|note3=|repealed=y|archived=n|}}
| {{|River Clydebridge, Lanark Act 1736|public|20|01-02-1737|note3=|repealed=y|archived=n|}}
| {{|Roding Navigation Act|note1= or the Roden (Roding) Navigation Act|public|33|01-02-1737|note3=|repealed=y|archived=n|note4=|An Act for making navigable the River Rodon from a little below a Mill called Barking Mill, in the County of Essex, to Ilford Bridge, in the said County.}}
| {{|Saint Andrew, Holborn-above-bars: Watching, etc. Act 1736|public|15|01-02-1737|note3=|repealed=y|archived=n|}}
| {{|Southampton Roads Act 1736|public|12|01-02-1737|note3=|repealed=y|archived=n|}}
| {{|Stock Jobbing Act 1736|public|8|01-02-1737|note3=|repealed=y|archived=n|}}
| {{|Surrey and Sussex Roads Act 1736|public|23|01-02-1737|note3=|repealed=y|archived=n|}}
| {{|Taxation Act 1736|public|1|01-02-1737|note3=|repealed=y|archived=n|}}
| {{|Thames Watermen Act 1736|public|31|01-02-1737|note3=|repealed=y|archived=n|}}
| {{|Warwickshire and Northamptonshire Roads Act 1736|public|11|01-02-1737|note3=|repealed=y|archived=n|}}
| {{|Watching: City of London Act 1736|public|22|01-02-1737|note3=|repealed=y|archived=n|}}
| {{|Watching: Holborn Act 1736|public|25|01-02-1737|note3=|repealed=y|archived=n|}}
| {{|Westminster Bridge Act 1736|public|16|01-02-1737|note3=|repealed=y|archived=n|}}
| {{|Whitechapel Roads Act 1736|public|36|01-02-1737|note3=|repealed=y|archived=n|}}
| {{|Wiltshire Roads Act 1736|public|6|01-02-1737|note3=|repealed=y|archived=n|}}
| {{|Worcester Roads Act 1736|public|5|01-02-1737|note3=|repealed=y|archived=n|}}
| {{|Worsley Brook: Navigation. Act 1736|public|9|01-02-1737|note3=|repealed=y|archived=n|}}
}}

1737 (11 Geo. 2)

| {{|Cawdle Fen, etc., Drainage Act 1737|public|34|24-01-1738|note3=|repealed=y|archived=n|}}
| {{|Christchurch, Middlesex: Lights and Watch Act 1737|public|35|24-01-1738|note3=|repealed=y|archived=n|}}
| {{|Christ Church, Surrey Act 1737|public|21|24-01-1738|note3=|repealed=y|archived=n|}}
| {{|Church of All Saints Worcester Act 1737|note1=|public|5|24-01-1738|note3=|repealed=y|archived=n|}}
| {{|Church Patronage Act 1737|note1=|public|17|24-01-1738|note3=|repealed=y|archived=n|}}
| {{|Cloth Manufacture Act 1737|public|28|24-01-1738|note3=|repealed=y|archived=n|}}
| {{|Continuance of Acts, 1737|public|18|24-01-1738|note3=|repealed=y|archived=n|}}
| {{|Corn Exportation Act 1737|note1=|public|22|24-01-1738|note3=|repealed=y|archived=n|}}
| {{|Crown Lands (Forfeited Estates): Greenwich Hospital Act 1737|public|30|24-01-1738|note3=|repealed=y|archived=n|}}
| {{|Deeping Fen Drainage Act 1737|public|39|24-01-1738|note3=|repealed=y|archived=n|}}
| {{|Derby Roads Act 1737|public|33|24-01-1738|note3=|repealed=y|archived=n|}}
| {{|Distress for Rent Act 1737|note1=|public|19|24-01-1738|note3=|repealed=n|archived=n|An Act for the more effectual securing the Payment of Rents, and preventing Frauds by Tenants.}}
| {{|Dover Harbour Act 1737|public|7|24-01-1738|note3=|repealed=y|archived=n|}}
| {{|Estate of Hugh Naish Act 1737|public|38|24-01-1738|note3=|repealed=y|archived=n|}}
| {{|Hertfordshire Roads Act 1737|public|10|24-01-1738|note3=|repealed=y|archived=n|}}
| {{|Indemnity Act 1737|public|31|24-01-1738|note3=|repealed=y|archived=n|}}
| {{|Insolvent Debtors Relief Act 1737|public|9|24-01-1738|note3=|repealed=y|archived=n|An Act for the Relief of such Prisoners for Debt as have by unavoidable Accidents lost the Benefit of an act passed in the last Session of Parliament, intituled, An Act for Relief of Insolvent Debtors; and for the Indemnity of such Sheriffs and Gaolers as have incurred any Penalties on Account of such Prisoners not being discharged; and for extending the Benefit of the said Act to Creditors, whose Debtors were committed to Prison since the First Day of January, One thousand seven hundred and thirty six, and have chose to continue there.}}
| {{|Inverness Beer Duties Act 1737|public|16|24-01-1738|note3=|repealed=y|archived=n|}}
| {{|Kent Roads Act 1737|public|37|24-01-1738|note3=|repealed=y|archived=n|}}
| {{|Land Tax Act 1737|public|14|24-01-1738|note3=|repealed=y|archived=n|}}
| {{|Liverpool Dock Act 1737|public|32|24-01-1738|note3=|repealed=y|archived=n|}}
| {{|Middlesex Roads Act 1737|public|6|24-01-1738|note3=|repealed=y|archived=n|}}
| {{|Minehead Harbour Act 1737|public|8|24-01-1738|note3=|repealed=y|archived=n|}}
| {{|Mutiny Act 1737|public|2|24-01-1738|note3=|repealed=y|archived=n|}}
| {{|National Debt Act 1737|public|27|24-01-1738|note3=|repealed=y|archived=n|}}
| {{|Nottinghamshire and Leicester Roads Act 1737|public|3|24-01-1738|note3=|repealed=y|archived=n|}}
| {{|Papists Act 1737|public|11|24-01-1738|note3=|repealed=y|archived=n|An Act for allowing further time for Inrolment of Deeds and Wills made by Papists, and for Relief of Protestant Purchasers, Devisees and Lessees.}}
| {{|Parliamentary Privilege Act 1737|note1=|public|24|24-01-1738|note3=|repealed=n|archived=n|An Act to amend an Act passed in the Twelfth and Thirteenth Year of the Reign of King William the Third, intituled "An Act for preventing any Inconveniences that may happen by Privilege of Parliament."}}
| {{|Poor Prisoners Relief Act 1737|public|20|24-01-1738|note3=|repealed=y|archived=n|}}
| {{|Retailers of Spirits Act 1737|public|26|24-01-1738|note3=|repealed=y|archived=n|}}
| {{|River Thames: Lastage and Ballastage Act 1737|public|12|24-01-1738|note3=|repealed=y|archived=n|}}
| {{|Rotherhithe Church Act 1737|public|13|24-01-1738|note3=|repealed=y|archived=n|}}
| {{|Saint Leonards, Shoreditch Act 1737|public|23|24-01-1738|note3=|repealed=y|archived=n|}}
| {{|Sale of Coal (London and Newcastle) Act 1737|public|15|24-01-1738|note3=|repealed=y|archived=n|}}
| {{|Shoreditch to Stamford Hill Road Act 1737|public|29|24-01-1738|note3=|repealed=y|archived=n|}}
| {{|Surrey and Kent Roads Act 1737|public|36|24-01-1738|note3=|repealed=y|archived=n|}}
| {{|Taxation Act 1737|public|1|24-01-1738|note3=|repealed=y|archived=n|}}
| {{|Westminster Bridge Act 1737|public|25|24-01-1738|note3=|repealed=y|archived=n|}}
}}

1738 (12 Geo. 2)

| {{|Bath Roads, Streets, etc. Act 1738|public|20|01-02-1739|note3=|repealed=y|archived=n|}}
| {{|Berkshire Roads Act 1738|public|11|01-02-1739|note3=|repealed=y|archived=n|}}
| {{|Coinage Duties Act 1738|public|5|01-02-1739|note3=|repealed=y|archived=n|}}
| {{|Colonial Trade Act 1738|public|30|01-02-1739|note3=|repealed=y|archived=n|}}
| {{|County Rates Act 1738|note1=|public|29|01-02-1739|note3=|repealed=y|archived=n|}}
| {{|Court of Chancery Act 1738|public|24|01-02-1739|note3=|repealed=y|archived=n|}}
| {{|Curriers, etc. Act 1738|public|25|01-02-1739|note3=|repealed=y|archived=n|}}
| {{|Derbyshire Roads Act 1738|public|12|01-02-1739|note3=|repealed=y|archived=n|}}
| {{|Ealing Church Act 1738|public|7|01-02-1739|note3=|repealed=y|archived=n|}}
| {{|Egham and Bagshot Road Act 1738|public|16|01-02-1739|note3=|repealed=y|archived=n|}}
| {{|Frauds in the Public Revenues, etc. Act 1738|public|22|01-02-1739|note3=|repealed=y|archived=n|}}
| {{|Gaming Act 1738|note1=|public|28|01-02-1739|note3=|repealed=y|archived=n|}}
| {{|Importation Act 1738|public|36|01-02-1739|note3=|repealed=y|archived=n|}}
| {{|Indemnity Act 1738|public|6|01-02-1739|note3=|repealed=y|archived=n|}}
| {{|Joanna Stephens' Reward (Cure for Stone) Act 1738|public|23|01-02-1739|note3=|repealed=y|archived=n|}}
| {{|Justices of Assize Act 1738|public|27|01-02-1739|note3=|repealed=y|archived=n|}}
| {{|Land Tax Act 1738|public|3|01-02-1739|note3=|repealed=y|archived=n|}}
| {{|Lincoln (City) Roads Act 1738|public|10|01-02-1739|note3=|repealed=y|archived=n|}}
| {{|Lincoln Roads Act 1738|public|8|01-02-1739|note3=|repealed=y|archived=n|}}
| {{|Mutiny Act 1738|public|2|01-02-1739|note3=|repealed=y|archived=n|}}
| {{|Papists Act 1738|public|14|01-02-1739|note3=|repealed=y|archived=n|An Act for allowing further time for Inrolment of Deeds and Wills made by Papists, and for Relief of Protestant Purchasers, Devisees and Lessees.}}
| {{|Plate (Offences) Act 1738|note1=|public|26|01-02-1739|note3=|repealed=y|archived=n|}}
| {{|Price of Bread, etc. Act 1738|public|13|01-02-1739|note3=|repealed=y|archived=n|}}
| {{|Provision for Duke of Cumberland, etc. Act 1738|public|15|01-02-1739|note3=|repealed=y|archived=n|}}
| {{|River Lee Act 1738|public|32|01-02-1739|note3=|repealed=y|archived=n|}}
| {{|Roads, Lincoln and Nottinghamshire Act 1738|public|34|01-02-1739|note3=|repealed=y|archived=n|}}
| {{|Roads, Northamptonshire Act 1738|public|35|01-02-1739|note3=|repealed=y|archived=n|}}
| {{|Saint Catherine Coleman Act 1738|public|17|01-02-1739|note3=|repealed=y|archived=n|}}
| {{|Saint Nicholas, Worcester Act 1738|public|4|01-02-1739|note3=|repealed=y|archived=n|}}
| {{|Supply, etc. Act 1738|public|19|01-02-1739|note3=|repealed=y|archived=n|}}
| {{|Taxation Act 1738|public|1|01-02-1739|note3=|repealed=y|archived=n|}}
| {{|Warwick Roads Act 1738|public|18|01-02-1739|note3=|repealed=y|archived=n|}}
| {{|Westminster Bridge Act 1738|public|33|01-02-1739|note3=|repealed=y|archived=n|}}
| {{|Wool Act 1738|public|21|01-02-1739|note3=|repealed=y|archived=n|}}
| {{|Woolwich Church Act 1738|public|9|01-02-1739|note3=|repealed=y|archived=n|}}
}}

1739 (13 Geo. 2)

| {{|Church in Sheffield Act 1739|public|12|15-11-1739|note3=|repealed=y|archived=n|}}
| {{|Commerce with Spain Act 1739|public|27|15-11-1739|note3=|repealed=y|archived=n|}}
| {{|Continuance of Acts, etc., 1739|public|28|15-11-1739|note3=|repealed=y|archived=n|}}
| {{|Destruction of Coal Works Act 1739|public|21|15-11-1739|note3=|repealed=y|archived=n|}}
| {{|Exemption from Impressment Act 1739|note1=|public|17|15-11-1739|note3=|repealed=y|archived=n|An act for the increase of mariners and seamen to navigate merchant ships and other trading ships or vessels.}}
| {{|Foundling Hospital Act 1739|public|29|15-11-1739|note3=|repealed=y|archived=n|}}
| {{|Frauds of Workmen Act 1739|public|8|15-11-1739|note3=|repealed=y|archived=n|}}
| {{|Gaming Act 1739|note1=|public|19|15-11-1739|note3=|repealed=y|archived=n|}}
| {{|Indemnity Act 1739|public|6|15-11-1739|note3=|repealed=y|archived=n|}}
| {{|Laws Continuance, etc. Act 1739|public|18|15-11-1739|note3=|repealed=y|archived=n|}}
| {{|Mutiny Act 1739|public|10|15-11-1739|note3=|repealed=y|archived=n|}}
| {{|Naturalization Act 1739|note1=(also known as the Plantation Act 1740)|public|7|15-11-1739|note3=|repealed=y|archived=n|An Act for Naturalizing such foreign Protestants and others therein mentioned, as are settled or shall settle in any of His Majesty's Colonies in America.}}
| {{|Naval Prize Act 1739|public|4|15-11-1739|note3=|repealed=y|archived=n|}}
| {{|Oxfordshire Roads Act 1739|public|15|15-11-1739|note3=|repealed=y|archived=n|}}
| {{|Parliamentary Elections (Fraudulent Conveyances) Act 1739|note1=|public|20|15-11-1739|note3=|repealed=y|archived=n|}}
| {{|Provision for the Princess Mary Act 1739|public|13|15-11-1739|note3=|repealed=y|archived=n|}}
| {{|River Colne, Essex, Navigation Act 1739|public|30|15-11-1739|note3=|repealed=y|archived=n|}}
| {{|River Dun, York: Navigation Act 1739|public|11|15-11-1739|note3=|repealed=y|archived=n|}}
| {{|River Medway, Navigation Act 1739|public|26|15-11-1739|note3=|repealed=y|archived=n|}}
| {{|Staines Bridge Act 1739|public|25|15-11-1739|note3=|repealed=y|archived=n|}}
| {{|Supply, etc. Act 1739|public|23|15-11-1739|note3=|repealed=y|archived=n|}}
| {{|Supply of Seamen Act 1739|public|3|15-11-1739|note3=|repealed=y|archived=n|}}
| {{|Taxation Act 1739|public|1|15-11-1739|note3=|repealed=y|archived=n|}}
| {{|Taxation Act 1739|public|2|15-11-1739|note3=|repealed=y|archived=n|}}
| {{|Vagrants Act 1739|public|24|15-11-1739|note3=|repealed=y|archived=n|}}
| {{|Warwick, etc., Roads Act 1739|public|5|15-11-1739|note3=|repealed=y|archived=n|}}
| {{|Warwick Roads Act 1739|public|22|15-11-1739|note3=|repealed=y|archived=n|}}
| {{|Westminster Bridge Act 1739|public|16|15-11-1739|note3=|repealed=y|archived=n|}}
| {{|Whitehaven Harbour Improvement Act 1739|public|14|15-11-1739|note3=|repealed=y|archived=n|}}
}}

See also
List of Acts of the Parliament of Great Britain

References

External links
The Statutes at Large
- Volume 14 - 5 George I to 9 George I - 1718-9 to 1722-3 - also
- Volume 15 - 9 George I to 2 George II - 1722-3 to 1728-9 - also
- Volume 16 - 2 George II to 9 George II - 1728-9 to 1735-6
- Volume 17 - 9 George II to 15 George II - 1735-6 to 1741-2

1720
1720s in Great Britain
1730s in Great Britain